Camille Simoine Winbush (born February 9, 1990) is an American actress and recording artist best known for her roles as Emma Aimes on short-lived sitcom Minor Adjustments, Vanessa Thomkins on The Bernie Mac Show and as Lauren Treacy on the popular teen drama The Secret Life of the American Teenager. Her work in television has earned her three Image Awards and a Young Artist Award.

Early life
Winbush was born in Los Angeles, California on February 9, 1990, the only child of Anthony and Alice Winbush. She never attended public school, having been homeschooled and educated by an on-set tutor while acting as a child. Winbush was a competitive gymnast during her childhood.

Career
Winbush made her acting debut on television series Viper in 1994, playing the role of Lucy Wilkes. The following year, she acted in her first film, Dangerous Minds. She appeared regularly on sitcom Minor Adjustments (1995−96) as Emma Aimes, the daughter of Rondell Sheridan's character. Winbush reprised her role of Emma on Brotherly Love in a Halloween episode.

She portrayed a young girl named Camille in Eraser (1996) and appeared as Pearline, a bookworm, in Ghost Dog: The Way of the Samurai (1999). Winbush had a recurring role on 7th Heaven and provided the voice of Ashley Tomossian on the Disney cartoon Recess.

Winbush's big break came in 2001 when she was cast as Vanessa Thomkins on The Bernie Mac Show, a role she would play until the series ended in 2006. During her run on the show Winbush earned numerous award nominations for her role, winning three NAACP Image Awards for Outstanding Supporting Actress in a Comedy Series and a Young Artist Award for Best Performance in a TV Series (Comedy or Drama) – Leading Young Actress in 2006.

She has guest starred on Strong Medicine, Criminal Minds, That's Life, The Norm Show, NYPD Blue, and Any Day Now. In 2007, she appeared in an episode of Grey's Anatomy. Winbush acted in Disney's musical production of Geppetto.

From 2008 to 2013, Winbush played Lauren Treacy, a recurring character in The Secret Life of the American Teenager. Winbush was cast as Miriam in the web series The Choir, replacing Idara Victor in the role. She provided the voice of Rhonda in Children of Ether and portrayed Syrena in Cannon Busters, both productions by animator LeSean Thomas.

Other ventures
In 2002, Winbush recorded "One Small Voice" featuring singers Myra and Taylor Momsen and "The Night Before Christmas Song" for the compilation album School's Out! Christmas. She also sang on the soundtrack of the Disney musical production of Geppetto.

As a teenager, Winbush operated an ice cream shop she named Baked Ice, located in Pasadena, California. It opened in 2003 and an aunt supervised the store when Winbush was unavailable. She received a Teenpreneur Award from Black Enterprise in 2004. The business was still extant as of 2005.

Filmography

Awards and nominations

References

External links
 

Living people
American film actresses
American television actresses
Actresses from California
African-American actresses
American child actresses
People from Culver City, California
20th-century American actresses
21st-century American actresses
1990 births
20th-century African-American women singers
21st-century African-American women
21st-century African-American people